Sir Simon Lane Tuckey (born 17 October 1941) is a retired British barrister and judge. He was a Lord Justice of Appeal from 1998 to 2008.

Biography 
Tuckey grew up in Southern Rhodesia (now Zimbabwe) and was educated at the Plumtree School. He was called to the English Bar by Lincoln's Inn in 1964 and practiced from 4 Pump Court, mainly in commercial law. He was appointed a Queen's Counsel in 1981 and was a Recorder from 1984 to 1992. He became a Bencher of Lincoln's Inn in 1989.

He was appointed a Justice of the High Court in 1992, receiving the customary knighthood. Assigned to the Queen's Bench Division, he was a judge of the Employment Appeal Tribunal from 1993 to 1998, Presiding Judge of the Western Circuit from 1995 to 1997, and Judge in Charge of the Commercial List from 1997 to 1998. In 1998, he was made a Lord Justice of Appeal and sworn of the Privy Council. He retired in 2008.

After his retirement, Tuckey practiced as an international arbitrator and mediator. From 2010 to 2012 he was a Judge of Appeal for Gibraltar.

References 

 https://www.ukwhoswho.com/view/10.1093/ww/9780199540884.001.0001/ww-9780199540884-e-38140
 https://www.commercialcourt.london/sl-tuckey

Knights Bachelor
Members of Lincoln's Inn
English King's Counsel
Queen's Bench Division judges
Lords Justices of Appeal
Members of the Privy Council of the United Kingdom
1941 births
Living people